Paimadó is the capital of Río Quito Municipality, Chocó Department in Colombia.

Climate
Paimadó has a very wet tropical rainforest climate (Af).

References

Populated places in Colombia